Diogo de Lima Barcelos sometimes known simply as Diogo, is a Brazilian striker who currently plays for Icasa. He was born in Porto Alegre, on April 5, 1985 and is the twin brother of Diego Barcelos.

Honours
 '''Campeonato Gaúcho: 2003, 2004.

See also
Diego de Lima Barcelos, twin brother

External links
 Sambafoot Profile

1985 births
Footballers from Porto Alegre
People from Rio Grande do Sul
Living people
Brazilian footballers
Campeonato Brasileiro Série A players
Sport Club Internacional players
Paulista Futebol Clube players
Figueirense FC players
Guangzhou F.C. players
Sport Club do Recife players
ABC Futebol Clube players
Expatriate footballers in China
Brazilian expatriate sportspeople in China
Brazilian twins
Twin sportspeople
Chinese Super League players
Association football midfielders